The Tennessee Volunteers baseball team represents the University of Tennessee in NCAA Division I college baseball. Along with most other Tennessee athletic teams, the baseball team participates in the Eastern division of the Southeastern Conference. The Volunteers play all on-campus home games at Lindsey Nelson Stadium.

Stadium 
Lindsey Nelson Stadium was constructed between 1992 and 1993 seasons at the site of the old facility called Lower Hudson Field. The program had played in past in various locations including Lower Hudson Field and Shields–Watkins Field.

Lindsey Nelson was a Hall of Fame Broadcaster, Tennessee native and university alumnus best known for his work with the University of Tennessee, University of Notre Dame, New York Mets, San Francisco Giants, National Football League and the annual Cotton Bowl Classic.

The playing field was named for Maryville, Tennessee native Robert M. Lindsay in 2007 after a $2 million athletic department contribution by Mr. Lindsay. Mr. Lindsay's father Rus Lindsay played baseball at the University of Tennessee from 1913 to 1916.

The record attendance at Lindsey Nelson stadium is 5,086 for an NCAA Regional championship game against Oklahoma State University on May 28, 1995.

Head coaches 
In 2017 Dave Serrano resigned following a 101-110 overall record and no post-season trips. On June 7, 2017 Tony Vitello accepted the position as head coach for Tennessee Baseball and in his first year compiled a 29-27 record, the most wins by a first-year head coach in program history. In just Vitello's second season at Tennessee he led the Vols to 40 wins and their first  NCAA Tournament appearance since 2005.

All-time season results

*Through May 21, 2016
*Note: there was no team in 1901; from 1932–1938 and from 1943–1946
Information Source: 2010 Tennessee Volunteers Baseball Media Guide - History section

NCAA Tournament record

Player awards

National awards
College World Series Most Outstanding Player
Sidney Hatfield (1951)
Collegiate Baseball Newspaper Freshman of the Year Award
R. A. Dickey (1994)
Chase Burns (2022)
Baseball America Freshman of the Year Award
R. A. Dickey (1994)
Dick Howser Trophy
Todd Helton (1995)
Baseball America College Player of the Year Award
Todd Helton (1995)
Collegiate Baseball Newspaper College Player of the Year Award
Todd Helton (1995)
Roger Clemens Award
Luke Hochevar (2005)

SEC Awards
Pitcher of the Year
Luke Hochevar (2005)
Chase Dollander (2022)
Player of the Year Award
Todd Helton (1995)
Jeff Pickler (1998)
Chris Burke (2001)
Freshman of the Year
J. P. Arencibia (2005)
Drew Beam (2022)

1st Team All-Americans

Notable former players 

Active Major League Players

 Yan Gomes
 Nick Senzel
 Drew Steckenrider
 Christin Stewart
 Andrew Toles
 Garrett Crochet

Others

 James Adkins
 J. P. Arencibia
 Ed Bailey
 Julio Borbon
 Chris Burke 
 Tommy Bridges
 Frank Callaway
 Alan Cockrell
 Kentrail Davis
 Rich DeLucia
 R. A. Dickey
 Mike DiFelice
 Matt Duffy
 Sam Ewing
 Phil Garner
 Zack Godley
 Chase Headley
 Deunte Heath
 Bronson Heflin
 Todd Helton
 Luke Hochevar
 Rick Honeycutt
 Luke Hudson
 Mike Lincoln
 Greg McMichael
 Augie Ojeda
 Matt Ramsey
 Joe Randa
 Rich Rodriguez
 Steve Searcy
 Mike Smithson
 Bubba Trammell

See also
List of NCAA Division I baseball programs

References

External links